Statzendorf is a municipality in the district of Sankt Pölten-Land in Lower Austria, Austria. It consists of the following towns:

Absdorf (1,17 km²)
Kuffern (5,07 km²)
Rottersdorf (2,70 km²)
Statzendorf (2,91 km²)
Weidling (0,61 km²)

Population

References

Cities and towns in St. Pölten-Land District